Bonny Lizie Baillie is Child ballad 227 (Roud 341). Some traditions claim it recounts an actual courtship.

Synopsis
Lizie Baillie meets a Highlander, Duncan Grahame, who courts her.  She says she does not know how to work at a farm, and he promises to teach her. She will not have any Lowlander or Englishman, and though he brought her home, she could not forget him.  They run away together, she giving up her silk dress for tartan, and marry.  She assures her father that they have married, and leaves her family.

See also
Glasgow Peggie
Lizie Lindsay
Dugall Quin
The Beggar-Laddie

References

External links
Bonny Lizie Baillie
Fragment with history.

Child Ballads
Year of song missing
Songwriter unknown